This is a list of famous Taiwanese people. People who were not born in Taiwan are indicated by an asterisk (*, notation incomplete).

Artists and performers 

 Alien Huang Hong sheng 黄鸿升
 Annie Shizuka Inoh 伊能静
 Chen Bo-lin 陳柏霖
 Chang Chen 張震
 Brandon Chang 張卓楠
 Brigitte Lin 林青霞
 Huang He 黃河
 Jerry Yan 言承旭
 Joe Chen Qiao En 陳喬恩
 Joey Wong 王祖賢
 Ken Chu 朱孝天
 Jimmy Lin 林志穎
 Ruby Lin 林心如
 Chase Tang 唐嘉壕
 Vanness Wu* 吳建豪
 Vic Chou 周渝民
 Kelly Lin 林熙蕾
 Barbie Shu 徐熙媛
 Rainie Yang楊丞琳
 Ariel Lin 林依晨
 Chang Shu-hao 張書豪
 Takeshi Kaneshiro 金城武
 Nicky Wu 吳奇隆
 Show Lo 羅志祥
 Jay Chou 周杰倫
 Cindy Yen 袁詠琳
 Chris Wang 王宥勝

Models 
 Lin Chi-ling 林志玲 
 Alicia Liu 劉薰愛
 Faith Yang 楊乃文
 Yinling 垠凌
 Sonia Sui 隋棠

Singers and bands for popular music 

 A-mei 張惠妹
 Alec Su 蘇有朋
 Alien Huang 黄鸿升
 Amber Liu* (f(x)) 劉逸雲
 Brandon Chang 張卓楠
 Chang Fei 張菲
 Cheer Chen 陳綺貞
 Chen Ying-Git 陳盈潔 
 Chou Chuan-huing 周傳雄
 Chthonic 閃靈
 Cindy Yen 袁詠琳
 Cyndi Wang 王心凌
 David Tao 陶喆
 Elva Hsiao 蕭亞軒
 Typhoon
 Evan Yo 蔡旻佑
 Evonne Hsu 許慧欣
 F.I.R 飛兒樂團
 F4
 Fahrenheit 飛輪海
 Fei Yu-ching 費玉清
 Fong Fei-fei 凤飞飞
 Freya Lim 林凡
 i.n.g 
 Jacky Wu 吳宗憲
 Jay Chou 周杰倫
 Jeff Chang 張信哲
 Jerry Yan 言承旭
 Jimmy Lin 林志穎
 Jiro Wang 汪東城
 Jody Chiang 江蕙
 Jolin Tsai 蔡依林
 Kang Jing Rong  康康 
 Ken Chu 朱孝天
 Lai Guanlin (Wanna One) 賴冠霖
 Landy Wen 溫嵐
 Leehom Wang 王力宏
 Liu Yangyang (NCT/WayV) 劉揚揚
 Lollipop F 棒棒糖
 Machi 麻吉
 Mark Tuan (Got7) 段宜恩
 Mayday 五月天
 Nicky Wu 吳奇隆
 Peggy Hsu 許哲珮
 Rainie Yang 楊丞琳
 Richie Ren 任賢齊
 S.H.E
 Seraphim 六翼天使
 Show Lo 羅志祥/小豬
 Shuhua ((G)I-DLE) 葉舒華
 Sodagreen 蘇打綠
 Takeshi Kaneshiro 金城武
 Tank 吕建忠
 Teresa Teng 鄧麗君
 Tim Wu* 金力若
 Tsai Chin 蔡琴
 Tzuyu (Twice) 周子瑜
 Vic Zhou 周渝民
 Vivian Hsu 徐若瑄
 Will Pan 潘瑋柏
 Wu Bai 伍佰

Musicians 
 Chen Da, singer
 Ch'eng Mao-yün*, violinist and composer
 Lin Cho-liang, violinist
 Jenny Lin, pianist
 Kessier Hsu, guitarist and composer
 Freddy Lim, vocalist and Hena player
 Julie Chang 張鈴, pianist and flutist
 Ching-Yun Hu, pianist
 Yo-Yo Ma*, cellist
 Ouyang Nana*, cellist, actress
 Ray Chen, Taiwanese-Australian violinist
 Yu-Chien Tseng, violinist

Fine artists

Film-makers 
 Ang Lee 李安, Academy Award winner
 Hou Hsiao-hsien* 侯孝賢, director of the A City of Sadness, Golden Lion winner
 Tsai Ming-liang* 蔡明亮, Golden Lion winner
 Wei Te-sheng 魏德聖
 Edward Yang 楊德昌, director of Yi Yi, winner of the Best Director Award in Cannes

Comedians
 Ed Hill (comedian), award-winning stand-up comedian

See also:  Cinema of Taiwan

Athletes

Billiards 

Jennifer Chen
Huang Hsin (pool)
Po-Cheng Kuo
Kun-Fang Lee
Hung-Hsiang Wang
Chia-Ching Wu
Ching-Shun Yang
Zhiting Wu

Badminton
 Tai Tzu-ying, at the age of 22, she became world No. 1 in the women's singles in December 2016, and holds the record for most weeks ranked at the top in BWF history
 Chou Tien-chen, currently 4th place in the BWF World Ranking (as of February 2021)

Basketball 

Jeremy Lin 林書豪, former NBA player
Joe Alexander (born 1986), American-Israeli basketball player for Maccabi Tel Aviv born in Taiwan
Cheng Chih-lung 鄭志龍
Chen Hsin-An (Sean Chen) 陳信安
Lee Hsueh-Lin 李學林
Tien Lei 田壘 (born 1983)
Tseng Wen-Ting 曾文鼎
Lin Chih-Chieh 林志傑
Jet Chang 張宗憲
Quincy Davis 戴維斯

Baseball

Infielders
Chin-Lung Hu, Los Angeles Dodgers 2007 All-Star Futures Game MVP
Yung-Chi Chen, Oakland Athletics 3A
Sen Yang, Uni-President Lions (CPBL)
Tai-Shan Chang, Sinon Bulls (CPBL)
Tzu-Wei Lin, Boston Red Sox

Outfielders
Chen Chih-peng, (CPBL) 2006–2010 seasons
Chia-Hsian Hsieh, Macoto Cobras (CPBL)
Chin-Feng Chen, Los Angeles Dodgers, La New Bears (CPBL)
Che-Hsuan Lin, Houston Astros 3A 2008 All-Star Futures Game MVP
Wang Po-Jung, Lamigo Monkeys (CPBL) 2016 CPBL MVP and ROY, first to record 200 hits in single season

Pitchers

Chien-Fu Yang, Uni-President Lions (CPBL)
Chien-Ming Wang, former MLB player.
Chien-Ming Chiang, Yomiuri Giants (NPB)
Chin-Hui Tsao, former MLB player.
En-Yu Lin, Tohoku Rakuten Golden Eagles (NPB)
Hong-Chih Kuo, former MLB player.
Ming-Chieh Hsu, Seibu Lions (NPB)
Tai-Yuan Kuo, former Seibu Lions (NPB)
Wei-Yin Chen, Hanshin Tigers (NPB), former MLB player.
Fu-Te Ni, former Fubon Guardians (CPBL), former MLB player.
Chia-Jen Lo, Wei Chuan Dragons (CPBL), former MLB player.
CC Lee, CTBC Brothers (CPBL), former MLB player.
Wei-Chung Wang, Wei Chuan Dragons (CPBL), former MLB player.

Golf 

Yani Tseng, LPGA player. She is the youngest player ever, male or female, to win five major championships and was ranked number 1 in the Women's World Golf Rankings for 109 consecutive weeks from 2011 to 2013.

Table tennis
Ben Chiu, 1st (1981 Jr. Canadian Champion), 2nd (1984 US Open doubles)

Tennis
Yen-Hsun Lu, professional player
Yeu-Tzuoo Wang, professional player
Jason Jung
Su-Wei Hsieh, winner of 3 WTA singles titles and 28 WTA doubles titles

Olympic medalists

Shih-Hsin Chen, gold medal, Athens Olympics, 2004
Mu-Yen Chu, gold medal, Athens Olympics, 2004
Chuan-Kwang Yang, silver medal, Rome Olympics, 1960
Chih-Hsiung Huang, silver medal, Athens Olympics, 2004; bronze medal, Sydney Olympics, 2000
Cheng Chi, bronze medal, Mexico Olympics, 1968

Businesspeople 
Momofuku Ando 吳百福, founder of Nissin Food Products Company Limited 
Jimmy Lin Chih Ying 林志穎, CEO of an IT company/has own racing team/owns JR(Jimmy Racing) company 
Morris Chang 張忠謀
 David Chu, co-founder of Nautica
Shenan Chuang 莊淑芬, chief executive officer for Ogilvy & Mather Greater China
Terry Gou 郭台銘
Jen Hsun Huang, co-founder, President and CEO of NVIDIA Corporation
 Min Kao, co-founder of Garmin
Koo Chen-fu  辜振甫
Winston Wang, founded Grace Semiconductor Manufacturing 
Wang Yung-ching 王永慶
Steve Chen, co-founder and Chief Technology Officer of YouTube 陳士駿
 Steve Chang, co-founder of Trend Micro 張明正
Stan Shih, co-founder of Acer  施振榮
Aimee Sun 孫芸芸, co-founder of Breeze Center 
Tsai Wan Lin, founder of Cathay Life Insurance
 Jerry Yang 楊致遠, computer scientist and entrepreneur, cofounder of Yahoo!  
 Ben Chiu 邱澤堃, founder of KillerApp.com acquired by CNET
William Wang, founder and CEO of VIZIO
Wu Yao-ting, founder of several large department stores

Educators 
 Winston Chang*
 Benjamin Hsiao, Chief Research Officer and vice-president for Research at Stony Brook University, Fellow of the American Physical Society, Fellow of the American Chemical Society, Fellow of the American Association for the Advancement of Science 
 Hu Shih*, philosopher, essayist and diplomat
 Henry T. Yang, Chancellor of the University of California, Santa Barbara

Linguists 
 Yuen Ren Chao*
 Woo Tsin-hang*, linguist

Others 
 Mai Chen, constitutional lawyer, emigrated to New Zealand
 Wen Ho Lee, engineer falsely accused of spying; author of book "My Country Versus Me" 李文和
 Fu Szeto (1916–92), commander-in-chief of the Air Force and presidential advisor
 Jason Wu, fashion designer
 Hsing Yun*, Buddhist monk and founder of Fo Guang Shan Order

Philosophers, thinkers, and writers 
 Yin Shun*, Buddhist scholarly writer and key figure of Humanistic Buddhism in Taiwan
 Sheng-yen*, Buddhist scholarly writer and founder of Dharma Drum Mountain Order
 Cheng Yen, founder of Tzu Chi
 Yifa, writer and founder of Woodenfish
 R. C. T. Lee (Chia-Tung Lee), writer and professor 
 Tu Wei-ming, ethicist
 Giddens Ko, novelist and filmmaker
See also: List of Taiwanese authors and List of Confucianists

Politicians 

 Tsai Ing-wen 蔡英文
 John Chiang* 蔣孝嚴
 Chang Chun*
 Chen Li-an*
 Chen Shui-bian 陳水扁
 Sisy Chen
 Chang Chau-hsiung
 Chang Chin-cheng
 Chiang Ching-kuo* 蔣經國
 Chiang Wei-kuo* 蔣緯國
 Chu Mei-feng
 Frank Hsieh 謝長廷
 Lee Teng-hui 李登輝
 Lien Chan* 連戰
 Lin Yang-kang 
 Annette Lu 呂秀蓮
 Ma Ying-jeou* 馬英九
 Vincent Siew 蕭萬長
 James Soong* 宋楚瑜
 Su Tseng-chang 蘇真昌
 Sun Yun-suan*
 Yu Shyi-kun 游錫堃
 Wang Chien-shien*
 Wang Jin-pyng 王金平
 Wang Xiang 
 Andrew Yang (US 2020 Presidential Candidate)

See also: List of leaders of the Republic of China, Premier of the Republic of China

Scientists, physicians and engineers 
 Yu-Ju Chen, proteogenomics researcher 陳玉如
 David Ho, medical researcher 何大一
 Henry Lee*, forensic expert 李昌鈺
 Sung-Yang Lee, entomologist 李淳陽
 Yuan T. Lee, Nobel laureate in chemistry 李遠哲
 Fushih Pan, medical researcher 潘扶適
 Chiaho Shih, researcher and former university professor 施嘉和
 Tsungming Tu, medical doctor 杜聰明
 Cheng-Wen Wu, biochemist 吳成文
 Chi-Huey Wong, biochemist 翁啟恵

See also 
 Taiwanese American
 Taiwanese Canadian
 List of people by nationality

References 

People